Prva Liga means First League in Bosnian, Croatian, Macedonian, Montenegrin, Serbian and Slovenian. It may refer to:

Prva A Liga, top tier of professional basketball in Montenegro
Prva Crnogorska Fudbalska Liga, Montenegrin First Football League
Prva Hrvatska Nogometna Liga, Croatian football top division
Prva Liga Federacija Bosne i Hercegovine, First League of Federation of Bosnia and Herzegovina, second tier of Bosnia and Herzegovina
Prva Liga Republike Srpske, First League of Republika Srpska, second tier of Bosnia and Herzegovina
Makedonska Prva Liga
Slovenian PrvaLiga, Slovenian football first division
Prva Liga Srbije, 2nd tier of Serbian football league system
Prva ženska liga, the top level women's football league of Serbia
Prva Liga Jugoslavije, defunct Yugoslav football top division

See also
 1. Liga (disambiguation)
 Liga 1 (disambiguation)
 Liga (disambiguation)